Yarilde or Jarildekald may be,

Jarildekald people
Jarildekald language

Language and nationality disambiguation pages